This is a list of cathedrals, churches and chapels in the London Borough of Barnet within the Greater London. The list focuses on the more permanent churches and buildings which identify themselves as places of Christian worship. The denominations appended are those by which they self-identify.

History
London's churches and chapels are extraordinarily numerous and diverse. Anglican and nonconformist churches and chapels are most numerous, but there are also many Catholic churches as well as places of worship for non-Christian religions.

Most of the Anglican churches lie within the Anglican dioceses of London to the north and Southwark to the south. A few Anglican churches in the Barnet area fall into the Diocese of St Albans, reflecting the historical association of Barnet with Hertfordshire. As London expanded during the early 19th century, many new churches and chapels were built independently by the growing nonconformist urban population.

Churches in this list belong to various denominations, as indicated.

List of churches
 Defunct churches

Related lists
 List of churches in London
 List of Christopher Wren churches in London
 List of places of worship in London, 1804
 Union of Benefices Act 1860
 Commission for Building Fifty New Churches

External links/sources
 Anglican Diocese of London
 Baptist Union Churches
 Church of England Parish Finder
 Church of England churches in central London
 The Church of Jesus Christ of Latter-day Saints
 The History Files Churches of the British Isles
 Congregational Churches in London
 Friends of the City Churches
 Gospel Hall Finder
 Greek Orthodox Archdiocese of Thyateira and Great Britain
 Love's Guide to the Church Bells of the City of London
 Methodist Church of Great Britain Church Search
 Roman Catholic Diocese of Brentwood Parishes A-Z
 Roman Catholic Diocese of Westminster – Virtual Diocese
 Roman Catholic Archdiocese of Southwark – Parish Directory
 Seventh-day Adventist Churches in London
 United Reformed Church Find A Church
 Redeemed Christian Church of God

Notes and references

 
 
Barnet
Barnet
Churches
Listed buildings in the London Borough of Barnet